Birenbach is a municipality in the district of Göppingen in Baden-Württemberg, Germany.

History
In 1806, all aristocratic properties in the area of Birenbach were mediatized to the now Kingdom of Württemberg. This district was reorganized in 1938 as Landkreis Göppingen.

Geography
The municipality (Gemeinde) of Birenbach is situated in the district of Göppingen, in Baden-Württemberg, one of the 16 States of the Federal Republic of Germany. Elevation above sea level in the municipal area ranges from a high of  Normalnull (NN) in the north to a low of  NN on the Krettenbach, in the south.

Politics
Birenbach has one borough (Ortsteil), the town of Birenbach, and one village, Schützenhof. There is an abandoned village in the municipal area, Bremenhöfle. Birenbach is part of the Östlicher Schurwald municipal association, headquartered at Rechberghausen.

Coat of arms
Birenbach's coat of arms displays a lion, in black and facing to the left, above a blue, wavy fess upon a field of yellow. The lion is taken from the coat of arms of the Hohenstaufen. This coat of arms was created and adopted by the municipal council in 1958, and was approved for official use by the Federal Ministry of the Interior on 18 August 1959. A corresponding municipal flag was issued to the municipality on the same date by the same body.

Transportation
From 1907 to 1987, the municipality was also connected to Germany's system of railways by the Tälesbahn.

References

External links

  (in German)

Göppingen (district)